La Federación was a periodical publication published in Barcelona during the Sexenio Democrático.

History 
The newspaper arose from a group of people originally linked to federal republicanism, who promoted it based on an agreement at the 1868 Barcelona Workers' Congress to create a press organ of the Federal Center of Workers' Societies of Catalonia. Its first issue appeared on August 1, 1869, presenting itself as a weekly publication, which would appear every Sunday. From July 23, 1870, it became the organ of the Barcelona federation of the International Workingmen's Association (IWA) and had a socialist ideology, close to the thought of the Russian anarchist Mikhail Bakunin, whose ideas the paper diffused throughout Spain, in addition to publishing texts by Pierre-Joseph Proudhon. It reached 229 numbers  — the last one appeared on January 3, 1874 — and included authors such as Rafael Farga i Pellicer, Gaspar Sentiñón, José García Viñas, Trinidad Soriano, Emili Hugas and Teobaldo Nieva.

Publication of La Federación was suspended following Manuel Pavia's coup by the dictatorial government of Francisco Serrano, due to the ideological stance of the weekly against the political and social system of the time. Between May and June 1872, the paper was briefly replaced by El Trabajo, which was subtitled Periódico socialista.

References

Bibliography 
 
 
 
 
 
 

Publications established in 1869
Publications disestablished in 1874
Spanish-language newspapers
Anarchist periodicals